Orestis Kiomourtzoglou (born 7 May 1998) is a German professional footballer who plays as a midfielder for Scottish Premiership club Heart of Midlothian. A SpVgg Unterhaching youth product, he made his senior debut in 2015 and remained with the club until 2019 when he moved to Dutch club Heracles Almelo. In 2022, he signed with Scottish side Heart of Midlothian.

Club career
Born in Munich, of Greek descent, he began his career in 2005 as a seven-year-old in the youth department of SpVgg Unterhaching. After playing in the various youth teams of Unterhaching, he made his senior debut on 17 July 2015, the first matchday of the 2015–16 season, in a game against FC Ingolstadt II in the Regionalliga Bayern, as an 84th-minute substitute for Maximilian Bauer. Two minutes after coming on, he scored his first senior goal to make the score 2–2. On 28 July 2017, the second matchday of the 2017–18 season, he made his professional debut, after Unterhaching had achieved promotion to the 3. Liga. He did this in a 3–2 win over Karlsruher SC. In the second match against Karlsruher SC during the season, a 3–1 loss on 20 January 2018, Kiomourtzoglou scored his first professional goal.

After playing fourteen years for Unterhaching, and making 94 first-team appearances for the team, Kiomourtzoglou signed with Dutch Eredivisie club Heracles Almelo in June 2019. Since his first league appearance for Heracles in a 1–1 draw against Fortuna Sittard on 11 August 2019, he has been a regular starter.

On 28 August 2022, Kiomourtzoglou signed a three-year contract with Heart of Midlothian in Scotland.

International career
Internationally, he has represented Germany at U21 level.

References

External links
 Career stats & Profile - Voetbal International

1998 births
Living people
Footballers from Munich
German footballers
Germany under-21 international footballers
Association football midfielders
SpVgg Unterhaching players
Heracles Almelo players
Heart of Midlothian F.C. players
Regionalliga players
3. Liga players
Eredivisie players
Scottish Premier League players
German people of Greek descent
German expatriate footballers
Expatriate footballers in the Netherlands
German expatriate sportspeople in the Netherlands
Expatriate footballers in Scotland
German expatriate sportspeople in Scotland